Eucithara striatissima is a small sea snail, a marine gastropod mollusk in the family Mangeliidae.

Description
The length of the shell attains 9.5 mm, its diameter 4.6 mm.

The shell is small, broad and has a biconical shape. It is densely encircled by spiral threads, of which there are about forty on the body whorl. There are about nineteen radials projecting as tubercles along the angle of the shoulder, but faint above and below. On the earlier whorls the shoulder nodules are proportionately more prominent. The whole surface has a secondary sculpture of close microscopic radial threads. The shell contains 7 whorls, including a small smooth protoconch of two helicoid whorls. The aperture  is incomplete, but commencing to form a varix and mounting on the preceding whorl.

Distribution
This marine species occurs off New Caledonia and Queensland, Australia

References

 Sowerby, G.B. 1907. Descriptions of new Marine Mollusca from New Caledonia, etc. Proceedings of the Malacological Society of London 7(5): 299-303
 Bouge, L.J. & Dautzenberg, P.L. 1914. Les Pleurotomides de la Nouvelle-Caledonie et de ses dependances. Journal de Conchyliologie 61: 123-214

External links
  Tucker, J.K. 2004 Catalog of recent and fossil turrids (Mollusca: Gastropoda). Zootaxa 682:1-1295
  Petit, R. E. (2009). George Brettingham Sowerby, I, II & III: their conchological publications and molluscan taxa. Zootaxa. 2189: 1–218
 Kilburn R.N. 1992. Turridae (Mollusca: Gastropoda) of southern Africa and Mozambique. Part 6. Subfamily Mangeliinae, section 1. Annals of the Natal Museum, 33: 461–575

striatissima
Gastropods described in 1907